is a Japanese politician of the Liberal Democratic Party, a member of the House of Councillors in the Diet (national legislature). A native of Tokamachi, Niigata and high school graduate, he was elected for the first time in 2004. Mizuochi, whose father was killed in action during the Pacific War, serves as the president of the Japan War-Bereaved Families Association since 2015.

References 

 

Members of the House of Councillors (Japan)
1943 births
Living people
Liberal Democratic Party (Japan) politicians